Frederick Harold Cheesmur (born Wandsworth, 16 January 1908, died Folkestone, 13 August 1987) was an English professional footballer.

Cheesmur's clubs included Charlton Athletic, Gillingham and Sheffield United. While playing for Gillingham in a match against Merthyr Town on 26 April 1930, he scored six goals, a club record haul for a single match at a professional level which stands to this day.

References

1908 births
1987 deaths
English footballers
Arsenal F.C. players
Charlton Athletic F.C. players
Gillingham F.C. players
Sheffield United F.C. players
Southend United F.C. players
Folkestone F.C. players
Dartford F.C. players
Association football inside forwards
Footballers from Wandsworth